Møns Klint is a 6 km stretch of limestone and chalk cliffs along the eastern coast of the Danish island of Møn in the Baltic Sea. Some of the cliffs fall a sheer 120 m to the sea below. The area around Møns Klint consists of woodlands, pastures, ponds and steep hills, including Aborrebjerg which, with a height of 143 m, is one of the highest points in Denmark. The cliffs and adjacent park are now protected as a nature reserve. Møns Klint receives around 250,000 visitors a year. There are clearly marked paths for walkers, riders and cyclists. The path along the cliff tops leads to steps down to the shore in several locations.

On 29 May 2007, close to the cliff tops, the GeoCenter Møns Klint was opened by Queen Margrethe. The geological museum with interactive computer displays and a variety of attractions for children traces the geological prehistory of Denmark and the formation of the chalk cliffs. The museum was designed by PLH Architects, the winners of an international  design competition.

Geology

The chalk forming the cliffs consists of the remains of shells from millions of microscopic creatures (coccolithophores) which lived on the seabed over 70 million years ago. As a result of huge pressure from glaciers moving west, the terrain was compacted and pushed upwards, forming a number of hills and folds. When the ice melted at the end of the last ice age about 11,000 years ago, the cliffs emerged. They form part of the same deposits as the cliffs of Rügen, Germany, on the other side of the Baltic. Today, it is possible to find fossils of various types of shellfish as the sea continues to erode the chalk. 
Erosion also caused one of the highest points on the cliffs, the "Sommerspiret", to fall into the sea in 1998, and in January 2007, there was an even larger landslide around the Store Taler, in the northern part of the cliffs, creating a 300-m long peninsula of chalk and fallen trees stretching out into the sea below.

Nature

Because of the special nature of the chalky soil, there are many rare plants in the area, particularly several varieties of orchid which are at their best in early summer. In particular, the tall lady orchid (Orchis purpurea) grows under the staircases leading down to the beach. The chalk also provides a distinctive light green tint to the beech trees along the top of the cliffs, maintaining their spring hues throughout the summer season. In the hilly park which stretches a couple of kilometers inland, there are a number of ponds and marshes, many populated by trees. Several signposted circuits provide opportunities for walkers, riders and cyclists to discover the surroundings.

In recent years, the peregrine falcon, the fastest of all birds as it swoops down to its prey at 350 km/h, has been observed breeding on Møns Klint. And the extremely rare large blue butterfly (Maculinea arion) can also be found in the area.

Points of interest
Liselund Park, at the northern end of the cliffs, is an attractive combination of small houses, ponds and rolling lawns built by Antoine de la Calmette for his wife Elisabeth or Lise at the end of the 18th century.

Klintholm Estate, to the west of the wooded area along the cliffs, is a collection of old farm buildings dating back to 1780 and a large park. The manor house which used to form part of the estate was demolished in 2000 as a result of dry rot.

The GeoCenter Møns Klint is a geological museum close to the top of the chalk cliffs. The museum explains the geology of the chalk cliffs and has exhibitions on the fossils found in the chalk. Near the museum start several walks to the cliffs, including two spectacular stairways from the top of the cliff to the beach.

Access

Møns Klint can be reached by road either directly from Stege or from Klintholm Havn. In the summer, there is a regular bus service. Accommodation is available within the cliff area itself or in hotels and pensions in the vicinity. There is a camping site close to the main entrance to the park and a youth hostel nearby.

Møns Klint in art

Møns Klint has been a popular subject for landscape painters, especially during the Danish Golden Age when the national romanticism movement encouraged artists to take renewed interest in the Danish countryside. A few examples are shown below.

References

External links

 Hybrid map from Google maps showing the cliffs along the eastern coast of Møn
 Møns Klint from the Insula Moenia site
 Impressive view of cliffs from the Klintholm site
 Geological description from Geosites
 The large landslide of Store Taler (now Store Taler Fald) in 2007

Cliffs of Denmark
Møn
Tourist attractions in Region Zealand
Geology of Denmark